The 1919 Victorian Football Association season was the 41st season of the Australian rules football competition. The season was the first to be played after hostilities ended in World War I, and saw a return to a full-length season featuring all ten clubs for the first time since 1914.

The premiership was won by the Footscray Football Club, after it defeated  by 22 points in the Grand Final on 27 September. It was the club's sixth VFA premiership. Footscray's premiership came after minor premier North Melbourne was undefeated through the home-and-home matches – and, in fact, undefeated since 1914 – before losing both finals matches it played.

Association membership 
The four clubs which opted not to play during 1918 due to World War I – Brighton, Essendon,  and Williamstown – returned to senior competition for the 1919 season. As a result, the Association returned to ten competing clubs, as it had been prior to the war.

Rule changes
After having played with each team fielding sixteen-a-side since 1912, the Association opted to return to fielding eighteen players on each team.

After a war-time agreement between the League and Association regarding player transfers between the two competitions expired in 1918, the Association introduced a rule which would see a player disqualified from the Association for two years if he transferred to a League club without a permit from the Association; but, as there was no longer a formal arrangement between the two competitions, such players remained free to play in the League during this period of disqualification.

Premiership 
The home-and-home season was played over eighteen rounds, with each club playing the others twice; then, the top four clubs contested a finals series under the amended Argus system to determine the premiers for the season.

Ladder

Finals

Notable events

North Melbourne's record winning streak 
From 1914 until 1919,  dominated the Association to compile a record winning streak. Between its two-point loss against  on 17 July 1914 and its nine-point loss against Brunswick in the semi-final on 13 September 1919, North Melbourne won a total of 58 consecutive matches – including 49 premiership matches and nine other matches, such as patriotic fund-raisers during the war. During this time, North Melbourne won three premierships (1914, 1915 and 1918), and completed two (shortened) unbeaten seasons: 15–0 in 1915 and 12–0 in 1918 – it was the last time a team won every match in a season until Geelong West in 1972 (Division 2), and the last time a team achieved it in the top division until Port Melbourne in 2011.

After losing the semi-final against Brunswick, North Melbourne also lost its next match – the Grand final against Footscray – to finish second for the season.

External links 
 List of VFA/VFL Premiers

References 

Victorian Football League seasons
VFL